Barbara Havers is a fictional detective in The Inspector Lynley series created by American mystery author Elizabeth George. Detective Sergeant Havers is one of the protagonists of the series and works under another leading character, Detective Inspector Thomas Lynley of Scotland Yard. 

The Lynley/Havers relationship is a complicated, multi-layered one that not only comprises tensions elicited by their investigations of difficult or high-profile murder cases but also interpersonal elements. DS Havers often clashes with DI Lynley not only because he is her superior officer but because of their socio-economic differences and her quick temper, which at one point results in her demotion to Detective Constable (or DC) and earns her the reputation of being difficult. The relationship frequently examines contemporary issues of gender and class. Lynley, the handsome and urbane eighth Earl of Asherton seemingly enjoys a gilded existence as a member of the nobility, whereas the working class, unpolished, and socially inept Havers often finds life a struggle. Initially, Havers despises all Lynley stands for, but she grudgingly comes to accept his innate decency while recognizing his faults, and the two achieve a positive, productive, if often conflicted working relationship.

Eleven of George's Lynley novels have been adapted for television by the BBC as The Inspector Lynley Mysteries. Havers is portrayed by Scottish actress Sharon Small; Nathaniel Parker plays Lynley. The series lasted for five complete seasons before being cancelled in August 2007. There are two episodes from an uncompleted sixth season.

External links
 The author's official website
 The Inspector Lynley Mysteries at bbc.co.uk
American-based Yahoo Group Discussion Board
UK-based Yahoo group for discussion of the BBC's Inspector Lynley TV series 

Fictional police detectives